Diasemiodes janassialis is a moth in the family Crambidae. It was described by Francis Walker in 1859. It is found in North America, where it has been recorded from Maryland to Florida and west to Texas.

References

Moths described in 1859
Spilomelinae